This is a list of episodes for Fast N' Loud Season 11. Season 11 started on August 29, 2016.

References 

2016 American television seasons